Caitlin Jean Stasey (born 1 May 1990) is an Australian actress and singer. She is known for her role as Rachel Kinski in Neighbours. Previously she played Francesca Thomas in The Sleepover Club, although her breakthrough film role came in Tomorrow, When the War Began, a 2010 film adaptation of the teen novel of the same name in which she played lead protagonist Ellie Linton. She also played Lady Kenna in the American series Reign from 2013 to 2015 and had a recurring role in the ABC2 series Please Like Me from 2013 to 2016. In 2017, Stasey starred as Ada on the Fox television drama APB, which was cancelled after one season in May 2017. In 2020, she starred in the short film Laura Hasn't Slept, and had a brief role as the same character in the feature film version Smile (2022).

Early life
Caitlin was born in Melbourne, Victoria, where she was raised with her younger sister Victoria. Her parents are David and Sally.

Stasey attended Star of the Sea College. In 2000, at the age of ten, she travelled the world as a member of the Australian Girls Choir, and took part in a re-recording of Peter Allen's "I Still Call Australia Home", for a Qantas commercial.

Career

Acting
Stasey made a career breakthrough in September 2003 when she was cast in the children's TV series The Sleepover Club, playing Francesca 'Frankie' Thomas, the self-appointed leader of the club. Stasey made a brief return to the character of Frankie, in the second series of The Sleepover Club in 2006.

After a year studying and attending auditions, in April 2005 Neighbours casting director Jan Russ cast her as Rachel Kinski. Her first episode was aired on 18 August. Stasey left Star of the Sea College after landing the part of Rachel, but continued to study on a distance education programme. In September 2008, Stasey announced in an interview to the Herald Sun that she would be leaving Neighbours in the coming weeks, primarily to concentrate on her end of year VCE exams. The producers stated that her character would not be 'killed-off', allowing Stasey the chance to return. Stasey said "I want to know that when I finish my exams and get my score, it is representative of my abilities, my exams start in November and I want to be able to give them my full concentration."

In 2008, Stasey was chosen to star in the movie adaptation of the teen novel, Tomorrow, When the War Began as the lead character Ellie Linton, a teenage girl who documents her time with a group of friends fighting the invasion of Australia. During 2008, Stasey was linked to the live action film of video game/comic series Wonder Boy. However, it was shut down by Sega. Robin Morningstar revived the project as a CGI movie, but Stasey withdrew to be in the film adaptation Tomorrow, When the War Began. Her CGI character, although with a new voice, retains her face. In December 2008, she appeared in the Christmas pantomime Snow White at Norwich Theatre Royal.

From 2013 to 2015, Stasey appeared in the American television series Reign as Kenna, a lady-in-waiting to Mary, Queen of Scots. From 2013 to 2016, she had a recurring role in the ABC2 series Please Like Me.

In 2013, she starred in the independent comedy-horror film All Cheerleaders Die as Maddy. The following year, she appeared in the movie I, Frankenstein as Keziah from the gargoyle order.

On 22 February 2016, Stasey was cast in the Fox drama APB as Ada Hamilton, The pilot received a series order on 10 May. which premiered in February 2017. The show was cancelled after one season in May 2017.

Stasey played ATF Agent Anya Ooms in the 2018 legal drama series For the People.

Music
In 2007, Stasey reportedly turned down a recording contract offered to her by Tom Nichols, who did the same for former Neighbours star Stephanie McIntosh. About it she said "acting is my main passion and I wanted to concentrate my efforts on that, although most actors have that triple threat of being able to sing, dance and act."

In 2008, she covered the song "I'm Yours", originally by Jason Mraz, for her TV show.

On 19 May 2008, Stasey sang a duet with fellow Neighbours cast member Dean Geyer (Ty Harper), performed at the Erinsborough High School Formal. Released to the Australian iTunes store, it peaked at number 40 on the ARIA Digital Tracks chart.

Personal life
Stasey says of her sexuality, "I know it troubles many people for me to refer to myself as a lesbian considering I have a male partner.... I'm trying to steer as far from labeling as possible. Compartmentalizing myself only leads to condemnation and contradiction. I'm happier being fluid and I'm happier being honest." She has also referred to herself as pansexual. In a 2015 interview for her website, Herself.com, Stasey stated that she is in a "somewhat open relationship with the love of my life".

As of 2014, Stasey was living in Los Angeles. Stasey was married to American actor Lucas Neff, but they are no longer together.

In March 2023, ELLE magazine listed Stasey's relationships with Sam Clark, Lucas Neff, and Erin Murphy-Muscatelli.

Filmography

References

External links

1990 births
Living people
Actresses from Melbourne
Australian child actresses
Australian child singers
Australian soap opera actresses
Australian people of English descent
21st-century Australian actresses
Australian LGBT actors
Australian LGBT singers
Pansexual actresses
Pansexual musicians
21st-century Australian singers
21st-century Australian women singers
Australian expatriate actresses in the United States
Australian film actresses
21st-century Australian LGBT people
People educated at Star of the Sea College, Melbourne